The Antelope Cave near Colorado City, Arizona is an archeological site that was listed on the National Register of Historic Places in 1975.  It was site of a prehistoric activity.

The cave was rediscovered in modern times by Winferd Gubler.  The cave is closed and barred and not open to the public.  Antelope Cave is located in Mohave County, Arizona southwest of Colorado City and Hildale, Utah and southeast of Hurricane, Utah.  It is close to a large power transmission line.

It is not related to Antelope Canyon in Coconino County, Arizona.

References 

Caves of Arizona
Geography of Mohave County, Arizona
Archaeological sites in Arizona
National Register of Historic Places in Mohave County, Arizona